Fino Mornasco (Brianzöö:   or simply ) is a comune (municipality) in the Province of Como in the Italian region Lombardy, located about  northwest of Milan and about  southwest of Como.  
 
Fino Mornasco borders the following municipalities: Cadorago, Casnate con Bernate, Cassina Rizzardi, Cucciago, Guanzate, Luisago, Vertemate con Minoprio.

References

External links
 Official website

Cities and towns in Lombardy